The Ali Amjad Clock is the oldest clock tower of Bangladesh located on the bank of Surma River in Sylhet City. It is locally known as "Ghori Ghar" and a popular tourist attraction adjacent to the Keane Bridge.

History 
The tower was constructed in 1872 by Ali Amjad's father, Nawab Moulvi Ali Ahmed Khan, just two years before he was born. Nawab Ali Amjad Khan was the 8th Nawab of the Prithimpasha estate in Kulaura, Moulvibazar.

A popular old poem about the Sylhet city mentions the clock:  This translates to "The steps of Channighat, the beard of Bonku Babu, the house of Jitu Miah, and the clock of Ali Amzad", all of which are local landmarks.

Gallery

References

External links

Clock towers in Bangladesh
Buildings and structures in Sylhet
Tourist attractions in Sylhet
1874 establishments in India